The National Audiovisual Centre ( or CNA) was created in 1989 and is based in Dudelange, Luxembourg. Its function is to safeguard and promote Luxembourgish audiovisual art. More specifically, it is concerned with photographic, audio and film work created by Luxembourgers or in Luxembourg. The centre also serves as a general exhibition and performance venue.

Examples of works 
Ray Tostevin's film "Léif Lëtzebuerger";
Marianne Majerus's photographs.

References

External links
 Centre national de l'audiovisuel website

Art museums and galleries in Luxembourg
Luxembourgian culture
Buildings and structures in Dudelange
Photography in Luxembourg
Art museums established in 1989
1989 establishments in Luxembourg